Kozar is a personal name with its origins in Turkic and/or Slavonic languages.

A founding myth among the Khazars, as related in texts such as the Khazar Correspondence and King Joseph's Reply to Hasdai ibn Shaprut, held that they were founded by Kozar, a son of the Biblical figure Togarmah (or Togarmas). In such texts, the brothers of Kozar are given varying names, including: Bulgar (founder of the Bulgars), Ujur (Uyghurs), Tauris (Tauri), Avar (Avars/Varchonites), Uguz (Oghuz Turks), Bizal, Tarna, Janur, and Sawir (the Sabirs). The medieval Jewish Joseph ben Gorion lists the sons of Togarmas as: Kozar, Pacinak (the Pechenegs), Aliqanosz (the Alans), Bulgar, Ragbiga (or Ragbina/Ranbona), Turqi (possibly the Göktürks), Buz (the Oghuz), Zabuk, Ungari (either the Hungarians or the Oghurs/Onogurs), and Tilmac (or Tilmic/Tirôsz; the Tauri). In the Chronicles of Jerahmeel, they are listed as: Cuzar (the Khazars), Pasinaq (the Pechenegs), Alan (the Alans), Bulgar (the Bulgars), Kanbinah, Turq, Buz, Zakhukh, Ugar (Hungarians or Oghurs/Onogurs), and Tulmes (or Tirôsz; the Tauri).  Another medieval rabbinic work, the Book of Jasher, gives the names: Buzar (the Khazars), Parzunac (the Pechenegs), Elicanum (the Alans), Balgar (the Bulgars), Ragbib, Tarki (the Göktürks), Bid (the Oghuz), Zebuc, Ongal (the Hungarians or Oghurs/Onogurs), and Tilmaz (or Tirôsz - the Tauri).

Khazars
Japheth
Turkic mythology